Ávalos is a Spanish surname. Notable people with the surname include:

Cristiano Ávalos dos Passos (born 1977), Brazilian footballer
Enrique Tovar Ávalos, Mexican film director 
Fernando Horácio Ávalos (born 1978), Argentine footballer
José Vicente Rangel Ávalos, the mayor of Sucre Municipality in Venezuela
Juan de Ávalos (1911-2006), Spanish sculptor
John Avalos (born 1964), American politician
Jorge Ramos Ávalos (born 1958), Mexican-American journalist and author. 

Luis Ávalos (1946–2014), Cuban actor

The d'Avalos were prominent in Renaissance Italy :

Fernando d'Avalos (1489-1525), 5th Marquess of Pescara, won the Battle of Pavia
Alfonso d'Avalos (1502-1546), Italian condottiero and 6th Marquess of Pescara
Francesco Ferdinando d'Ávalos (1530–1571), 7th Marquess of Pescara

Spanish-language surnames